Juan Carlos Latorre Carmona (born 25 March 1949) is a Chilean politician who served as member of the Chamber of Deputies, representing the former District 35 of the O'Higgins Region.

Academic background
From 1966 on, Latorre studied physics and mathematics at the University of Chile. Later he graduated from Master of Regional Planning and Development at the University of Karlsruhe in Germany.

Political life
In 1989 he was elected MP by the District 35, Region VI, a position he held until 1998, after being reelected in 1993. During this period he became Vice President of the Chamber of Deputies.

In 1998, President Eduardo Frei Ruiz-Tagle appointed him as Secretary for Public Works, in charge which was ratified by President Ricardo Lagos in March 2000. In December 2005 he was elected deputy for the period 2006–2010.

He is Chairman of the Committee on Public Works, Transport and Telecommunications of the House of Deputies of Chile.

References

External links 

1949 births
Living people
People from Santiago
Chilean people of Spanish descent
Christian Democratic Party (Chile) politicians
Members of the Chamber of Deputies of Chile